The House of Understanding is a place in the fictional world of David Farland's Runelords saga. The House is a place of learning, much like a university, where students seek to increase their knowledge and understanding of the world around them.

Location 

The House of Understanding is located in the realm of Mystarria, one of the Kingdoms of Rofehavan from the Runelords saga. It is situated in the Courts of Tide, near to the capital of Mystarria.

Principles 

The House of Understanding consists of many individual Rooms. The students of the House study various disciplines, each taught in a specific Room. Each of the Rooms of Understanding's House has a hearthmaster appointed to them. These hearthmasters excel in the disciplines which they teach, and are much like the lecturers and professors of modern universities.

Rooms 

The Rooms of the House of Understanding include:

 The Room of Faces; and
 The Room of Feet:
 These two Rooms teach applicants how to recognize body language and how to hide their own emotions by changing their facial expression and stance. Actors and dancers learn their talents in these rooms. In the Room of Faces, students learn various methods of understanding body language. 

 

 The Room of Arms:
 Students of this Room learn skill with weapons and hand-to-hand combat. Different combat forms are taught there, including the Dancing Arms style. Warriors and soldiers study in this Room, as well as Runelords who seek to improve their skills.

 The Room of Hands; and
 The Room of Gold:
 In these two rooms, merchant princes and traders learn of money: how to best calculate and increase a businesses profit.

 The Room of the Heart:
 Frequented by troubadours and philosophers, students of this Room learn of the workings of the human mind and heart.

 The Room of Dreams:
 Students of the Room of Dreams learn of man's motivations and desires. The teachings of this Room are considered too powerful to place in the hands of a Runelord, and are forbidden. Only those of the order of the Days may learn here.

References 

Runelords series